The following list includes all of the Canadian Register of Historic Places listings in East Kootenay Regional District, British Columbia.

References 

(references appear in the table above as external links)

East Kootenay Regional District